Biritiba Mirim is a Brazilian municipality of the state of São Paulo. It is part of the Metropolitan Region of São Paulo. The population is 32,936 (2020 est.) in an area of 317.41 km². Its limits are Guararema in the north, Salesópolis in the east, Bertioga to the south and Mogi das Cruzes in the west and northwest.

References

External links 
  Biritiba Mirim Official Site

Municipalities in São Paulo (state)